Angaité is a language of the Paraguayan Chaco. Many children speak only Guarani, but may understand Angaité.

References

Languages of Paraguay
Mascoian languages
Articles citing ISO change requests
Chaco linguistic area